Capital punishment is a legal penalty in the U.S. state of North Carolina.

Despite remaining a legal penalty, there have been no executions in North Carolina since 2006. A series of lawsuits filed in state courts questioning the fairness and humanity of capital punishment have created a de facto moratorium on executions being carried out in North Carolina. The last person executed in the state was convicted murderer Samuel Flippen.

Legal process
When the prosecution seeks the death penalty, the sentence is decided by the jury and must be unanimous. 

In case of a hung jury during the penalty phase of the trial, a life sentence is issued, even if a single juror opposed death (there is no retrial).

The power of clemency belongs to the Governor of North Carolina.

The method of execution is lethal injection.

Capital crimes
First-degree murder is punishable by death in North Carolina if it involves one of the following aggravating factors:

The capital felony was committed by a person lawfully incarcerated.
The defendant had been previously convicted of another capital felony.
The defendant had been previously convicted of a felony involving the use or threat of violence to the person.
The capital felony was committed for the purpose of avoiding or preventing a lawful arrest or effecting an escape from custody.
The capital felony was committed while the defendant was engaged, or was an aider or abettor, in the commission of, or an attempt to commit, or flight after committing or attempting to commit, any homicide, robbery, rape or a sex offense, arson, burglary, kidnapping, or aircraft piracy or the unlawful throwing, placing, or discharging of a destructive device or bomb.
The capital felony was committed for pecuniary gain.
The capital felony was committed to disrupt or hinder the lawful exercise of any governmental function or the enforcement of laws.
The capital felony was committed against a law-enforcement officer, employee of the Division of Adult Correction of the Department of Public Safety, jailer, fireman, judge or justice, former judge or justice, prosecutor or former prosecutor, juror or former juror, or witness or former witness against the defendant, while engaged in the performance of his official duties or because of the exercise of his official duty.
The capital felony was especially heinous, atrocious, or cruel.
The defendant knowingly created a great risk of death to more than one person by means of a weapon or device which would normally be hazardous to the lives of more than one person.
The murder for which the defendant stands convicted was part of a course of conduct in which the defendant engaged and which included the commission by the defendant of other crimes of violence against another person or persons.

Death row
Death row for males is located at the Central Prison.  Female death row prisoners are housed at the North Carolina Correctional Institution for Women. Both prisons are located in Raleigh.

See also
 List of people executed in North Carolina
 List of death row inmates in North Carolina
 Crime in North Carolina
 Law of North Carolina

Footnotes

Further reading
Seth Kotch, Lethal State: A History of the Death Penalty in North Carolina. Chapel Hill, NC: University of North Carolina Press, 2019.

 
North Carolina